TAKT is a group of writers and composers of new songs for use in Christian churches, initiated in 1947. The genre which the members promoted was later called Neues Geistliches Lied. The name is short for TextAutor/innen- und Komponist/innen-Tagung (Convention of text authors and composers), a name that the group adopted in 1997.

History 
In 1947 a group of the Catholic Church was founded, Werkgemeinschaft Lied und Musik (Workshop song and music), which held annual conventions. In 1950, a Protestant group was founded, Arbeitsgemeinschaft für evangelische Jugendmusik (AGM, Association for Protestant youth music). 

From 1971, ecumenical annual meetings of members of both groups were held, initiated by the two presidents, Joachim Schwarz (AGM) and Johannes Aengenvoort. From 1979 to 1989, the annual meetings were at Knivsberg in Denmark, which enabled people from East Germany to attend. After the unification of Germany, the meetings were held in Germany, organized by the group.

Many songs by members of the group have been included in hymnals, including the Catholic Gotteslob and the Protestant Evangelisches Gesangbuch. Many songs were tried first at events such as Kirchentag and Katholikentag. The group published a collection of songs for the Kirchentag in Cologne 2007, Singen, um gehört zu werden (Sing, to be heard), with 119 songs from three decades.

Songs 
Well-known songs in the genre NGL by members of TAKT include:
 "Ausgang und Eingang" (round by Joachim Schwarz)
 "Singet dem Herrn ein neues Lied" (music: Rolf Schweizer)
 "Auf Erden Gast sein" (text: Arnim Juhre, music: Oskar Gottlieb Blarr)
 "Wer bringt dem Menschen, der blind ist, das Licht" (text: Hans-Jürgen Netz, music: Blarr) 
 "Der Himmel geht über allen auf" (text: Wilhelm Willms music: Peter Janssens)
 "Wenn das rote Meer grüne Welle hat" (text: Wilhelm Willms, music: Janssens)
 "Gott gab uns Atem, damit wir leben" (text: Eckart Bücken, music: Fritz Baltruweit)
 "Komm Herr, segne uns" (text and musik: Dieter Trautwein)
 "Ein Lied hat die Freude sich ausgedacht" (text: Hartmut Handt, music: Nis-Edwin List-Petersen)
 "Freunde, dass der Mandelzweig wieder blüht und treibt" (text: Schalom Ben-Chorin, music: Baltruweit)

Members 
Members have included:

Writers 
 Friedrich Karl Barth
 Monika Bohge
 Eckart Bücken
 Susanne Brandt
 Wolfgang Fietkau
 Frank Fockele
 Dieter Frettlöh
 Hartmut Handt
 Arnim Juhre
 Klaus-Uwe Nommensen
 Ute Passarge
 Kurt Rose
 Kurt Rommel
 Otmar Schulz
 Dieter Trautwein
 Rudolf Otto Wiemer
 Wilhelm Willms
 Lothar Veit
 Hildegard Wohlgemuth
 Stefan Wolfschütz

Composers 
 Ernst Arfken
 Fritz Baltruweit
 Herbert Beuerle
 Oskar Gottlieb Blarr
 Ludger Edelkötter
 Lothar Graap
 Winfried Heurich
 Peter Janssens
 Detlev Jöcker
 Wilhelm Keller
 Holger Kiesé
 Felicitas Kukuck
 Nis-Edwin List-Petersen
 Christoph Noetzel
 Hartmut Reußwig
 Paul Ernst Ruppel
 Manfred Schlenker
 Joachim Schwarz
 Rolf Schweizer
 Erna Woll
 Stephan Zebe

Literature 
 Arnim Juhre (ed.): Singen, um gehört zu werden. Jugenddienst-Verlag, Wuppertal 1976, .
 Susanne Brandt, Frank Fockele, Hartmut Handt, Arnim Juhre, Klaus-Uwe Nommensen, Hartmut Reußwig und Lothar Veit (ed.): Singen, um gehört zu werden. Neue Lieder aus drei Jahrzehnten. Strube, München 2007. (preface)

See also 
:de:Liste von Autoren Neuer Geistlicher Lieder 

German artist groups and collectives
1947 establishments in Germany